Pedro Iván Sánchez Torrealba (born 7 February 1998) is a Chilean footballer who plays for Everton.

References

External links
 

1998 births
Living people
Chilean footballers
Sportspeople from Viña del Mar
Chilean Primera División players
Primera B de Chile players
Everton de Viña del Mar footballers
Unión La Calera footballers
Association football midfielders